Allu–Konidela family is a prominent Indian film family known for their work in Telugu cinema.  At least 3 generations of the family are involved in films, business ventures, and politics. Prominent heads of the family are comic actor Allu Ramalingaiah and his son-in-law, actor-politician Chiranjeevi. 

The family is colloquially known as Mega family in reference to the moniker of ChiranjeeviMega Star. This family is one of prominent family in India considering film industry sector.

Overview 
Allu–Konidela family have their origins in Mogalthuru and Palakollu villages of West Godavari district in the Indian state of Andhra Pradesh.

Chiranjeevi is married to Surekha, daughter of Allu Ramalingaiah and sister of Telugu film producer Allu Aravind. The couple has three children: a son, Ram Charan, and two daughters, Sushmitha and Sreeja. Ram Charan is one of the highest paid actors of Telugu cinema. He is married to Upasana Kamineni, grand-daughter of businessman Prathap C. Reddy, since 2012 and in December 2022, the couple announced that they were expecting their first child. Chiranjeevi's elder daughter, Sushmitha, is married to L.V. Vishnu Prasad since 2006, and they are the parents of two children.

Chiranjeevi has two brothers, Nagendra Babu, and actor-politician Pawan Kalyan. Nagendra Babu's children are Varun Tej and Niharika.

Kalyan has been married thrice; to Nandini, Renu Desai and Anna Lezhneva. He has two children with Desai ― Akira Nandan and Adya ― and two more children with Lezhneva ― Polena Anjana Pawanovna and Mark Shankar Pawanovich.

Allu Aravind, with his wife Nirmala, has three children ― Venkatesh, Arjun, and Sirish. The latter two are actors in Telugu cinema. Allu Arjun is married to Sneha Reddy, and the couple has two children, Ayaan and Arha.

Chiranjeevi has two sisters, Vijaya Durga and Madhavi Rao. Durga has two sons, Sai Dharam Tej and Panja Vaishnav Tej, both of whom are actors.

Family tree

See also
 Akkineni–Daggubati family

References 

Indian families
Hindu families
Telugu film families
Families of Indian cinema
Telugu people